William Hunting "Bill" Cooper (August 4, 1910 – March 19, 1968) was an American sailor who competed in the 1932 Summer Olympics. In 1932 he was a crew member of the American boat Angelita which won the gold medal in the 8 metre class.

References

External links
 
 
 

1910 births
1968 deaths
American male sailors (sport)
Sailors at the 1932 Summer Olympics – 8 Metre
Olympic gold medalists for the United States in sailing
Medalists at the 1932 Summer Olympics